K-pop Cover Dance Festival is an international amateur dance competition, organised with the support of the South-Korean television network MBC. The contestants perform dance covers of K-pop songs, i.e. imitate choreography performed by K-pop artists.

Selection process 
In order to participate, all competitors must film their dance routines on video and submit the videos online. All videos go through an online selection process and the best contenders earn the right to compete live in local selection contests in their respective countries. The winners of the local rounds are invited to Korea where the final round takes place.

Popularity and number of participants 
In 2011, over 1,700 contenders from 64 countries submitted their dance videos. 66 contestants were selected to go to South Korea to participate in the final.

Competition

References

External links 
 Official site of the K-pop Cover Dance Festival 

Dance competitions
K-pop festivals